Rossene Mpingo (born 31 August 1997) is a male Democratic Republic of the Congo sprinter. He competed in the 100 metres event at the 2015 World Championships in Athletics in Beijing, China. In 2019, he competed in the men's 100 metres event at the 2019 World Athletics Championships in Doha, Qatar. He competed in the preliminary round and he did not advance to compete in the heats.

See also
 Democratic Republic of the Congo at the 2015 World Championships in Athletics

References

External links

1997 births
Living people
Democratic Republic of the Congo male sprinters
Place of birth missing (living people)
World Athletics Championships athletes for the Democratic Republic of the Congo